The  was a field army of the Imperial Japanese Army during World War II.

History
The Japanese 8th Area Army was formed on November 16, 1942 under the Southern Expeditionary Army Group for the specific task of opposing landings by Allied forces in Japanese-occupied Solomon Islands and New Guinea. It had its headquarters at Rabaul, New Britain and saw considerable combat in the Solomon Islands campaign, Bougainville campaign and New Guinea campaign.

List of Commanders

References

Books

External links

Notes 

8
Military units and formations established in 1942
Military units and formations disestablished in 1945